High-performance equipment describes telecommunications equipment that
(a) has the performance characteristics required for use in trunks or links,
(b) is designed primarily for use in global and tactical systems, and
(c) sufficiently withstands electromagnetic interference when operating in a variety of network or point-to-point circuits.

Note:  Requirements for global and tactical high-performance equipment may differ.

Telecommunications equipment